The Brugg–Hendschiken railway line is a standard gauge railway line located in the canton of Aargau, in Switzerland. The line runs north-south and interchanges with several other lines, including the Rupperswil–Immensee, Heitersberg / Zofingen–Wettingen, Baden–Aarau, and Bözberg. The Aargau Southern Railway opened the line in 1882 and it has belonged to Swiss Federal Railways since 1902.

History 
The Aargau Southern Railway completed the line on 1 June 1882. It was the final line built by that company. The line passed to Swiss Federal Railways in 1902 after the Aargau Southern Railway, along with its corporate parents the Swiss Central Railway and Swiss Northeastern Railway, were nationalized.

Route 
It runs south to Othmarsingen and a junction with the Heitersberg and Zofingen–Wettingen lines. At Hendschiken it joins with another former Aargau Southern line, the Rupperswil–Immensee.

Operation 
The S23 uses the line between Othmarsingen and Brugg, combining with the S25 for half-hourly service between those stations. In addition, the rush-hour S42 of the Zürich S-Bahn, which operates between Muri AG and Zürich Hauptbahnhof, uses the line between Hendschiken and Othmarsingen.

Notes

References

External links 

 2021 timetable

1882 establishments in Switzerland
Railway lines opened in 1882
Railway lines in Switzerland
15 kV AC railway electrification